Sidi Brahim is a small commune of Sidi Bel Abbès Province, Algeria. It gives its name to Sidi Brahim wine and was the location of the Battle of Sidi Brahim in 1845 during the French conquest of Algeria.

During the Roman Empire Sidi Brahim was the site of a town of the province of Mauretania Caesariensis called Bencenna. The remains of Bencenna were tentatively identified with ruins at Sidi Brahim.

References

Populated places in Sidi Bel Abbès Province
Archaeological sites in Algeria
Roman towns and cities in Algeria
Catholic titular sees in Africa
Cities in Algeria
Algeria